The 2003 Kisima Music Awards signalled a revitalisation of the scheme. They were held in a customised "Kisima Dome" and hosted by radio presenters Bernard Otieno and Pinky Ghelani.

Winners

See also
Kisima Music Awards

External links
2003 Kisima Music Award Winners

References

Kisima Music Award winners